Nibbio has been the name of at least two ships of the Italian Navy and may refer to:

 , an  ordered by Romania as Vartez. Seized in 1915 by Italy and renamed before her launch in 1918. Purchased again by Romania in 1920 and renamed Marasesti.
 , a  launched in 1980 and retired in 1998.

Italian Navy ship names